Shinobu Asagoe and Nana Miyagi were the defending champions, but lost in quarterfinals to Yan Zi and Zheng Jie.

Maria Sharapova and Tamarine Tanasugarn won the title by defeating Ansley Cargill and Ashley Harkleroad 7–6(7–1), 6–0 in the final.

This tournament saw an unusual event, as all seeded pairs were eliminated in quarterfinals.

Seeds

Draw

Draw

References
 Official Results Archive (ITF)
 Official Results Archive (WTA)

Doubles